Michael Z. Lin (born 1973 in Taipei, Taiwan) is a Taiwanese-American biochemist and bioengineer. He is an Associate Professor of Neurobiology and Bioengineering at Stanford University. He is best known for his work on engineering optically and chemically controllable proteins.

Education and career
Lin graduated from Harvard University in 1994 with a degree in biochemical sciences summa cum laude. He subsequently trained as a PhD student studying neuronal signal transduction with Michael E. Greenberg at Harvard Medical School, graduating in 2002, and obtained a MD at UCLA in 2004. Lin then performed postdoctoral research with Chemistry Nobel Prize Laureate Roger Y. Tsien at UCSD. Since 2009, he has been a member of the faculty at the Stanford University School of Medicine.

Research
During postdoctoral training with Roger Y. Tsien, Lin developed improved red fluorescent proteins and channelrhodopsins, and pioneered the use of drug-regulated proteases for protein modification in the TimeSTAMP protein labelling method. 
Lin's group at Stanford University has engineered proteins with novel functions for optogenetics, chemogenetics, and synthetic biology. Notable inventions include:
 Red fluorescent and bioluminescent proteins
 Optically switchable proteins using an engineered green fluorescent protein
 The ASAP genetically encoded voltage indicator family
 Chemical control of protein expression by proteases of RNA viruses
 Synthetic proteins that rewire cancer signals to therapeutic activation
SARS-CoV-2 protease inhibitors based on modifying HCV protease inhibitors

Awards and honors
 Burroughs Wellcome Fund Career Award in Medical Sciences (2007)
 National Institutes of Health Director's Pioneer Award (2013)
 Rita Allen Foundation Scholar (2016)
 World Molecular Imaging Society Roger Tsien Awardee for Excellence in Chemical Biology (2019)

See also
 Genetically encoded voltage indicator
 Optogenetics
 Chemogenetics
 Chemical biology
 Synthetic biology
Medicinal chemistry

References

Living people
1973 births
21st-century scientists
21st-century biologists
21st-century chemists
American people of Taiwanese descent
Stanford University faculty
Harvard Medical School alumni
University of California, Los Angeles alumni
Harvard College alumni